Russell is a census-designated place that comprises the populated center of the town of Russell in Hampden County, Massachusetts, United States. The population of the CDP was 786 at the 2010 census, out of 1,775 in the entire town of Russell. It is part of the Springfield, Massachusetts Metropolitan Statistical Area.

Geography
The Russell CDP is in the northern part of the town of Russell, along U.S. Route 20 in the valley of the Westfield River. The CDP is bordered to the east by the Westfield River, to the west by the Blandford town line, and to the south by Blandford Stage Road. To the north the CDP reaches to a line just south of the village of Crescent Mills.

Demographics

References

Populated places in Hampden County, Massachusetts
Census-designated places in Hampden County, Massachusetts
Census-designated places in Massachusetts
Springfield metropolitan area, Massachusetts